The 2017–18 Melbourne Victory FC season was the club's 13th season since its establishment in 2004. The club participated in the A-League for the 13th time, the FFA Cup for the fourth time, as well as the AFC Champions League for the sixth time.

Players

Squad information

From youth squad

Transfers in

Transfers out

Contract extensions

Technical staff

Statistics

Squad statistics

|-
|colspan="24"|Players no longer at the club:

Pre-season and friendlies

Competitions

Overall

A-League

League table

Results summary

Results by round

Matches

Finals series

FFA Cup

AFC Champions League

Group stage

References

Notes

External links
 Official Website

Melbourne Victory
Melbourne Victory FC seasons